"BB Talk" is a song by American singer Miley Cyrus for her fifth studio album Miley Cyrus & Her Dead Petz (2015). It was premiered through SoundCloud on August 30, 2015 alongside the parent record. Its lyrics discuss Cyrus' frustration with an overbearing romantic interest over primarily spoken verses. "BB Talk" was supplemented with an accompanying music video on December 11, 2015, featuring Cyrus as an adult baby. Cyrus performed the track during her Milky Milky Milk Tour in November and December.

Composition
The track was written and produced by Cyrus, with additional production provided by Oren Yoel and The Flaming Lips. "BB Talk" is the seventh track on Miley Cyrus & Her Dead Petz, and plays for a duration of four minutes and thirty-two seconds. The previous track "Fuckin Fucked Up" is a 51-second interlude between "Space Bootz" and "BB Talk", repeating the latter's opening lyrics "this is really fucked up". The song is "about a girl who’s tired of hearing her boyfriend make baby talk every time they have sex" and features Cyrus singing the lyric "Fuck me so you stop baby talking". NME described the song as being "hip-hop-flavoured [sic]".

Music video
MTV posted a 10-second preview of the music video for "BB Talk" on their website on December 9, showing Cyrus dressed in a curly blonde wig and purple pajama onesie while sucking on a pacifier. The clip was premiered in its entirety through their website on December 11, and was released onto Vevo platforms later that evening. Directed by Cyrus herself alongside longtime collaborator Diane Martel, it drew media attention for its depiction of Cyrus as an adult baby.

Credits and personnel
Credits adapted from Cyrus' website.

Recording
 Recorded at Love Yer Brain Studios
 Mixed at Whitley Room Studios (Hollywood, California)

Personnel
 Miley Cyrus – lead vocals, songwriting, vocal production, mixing
 Doron Dina – assistant
 The Flaming Lips – vocal production, mixing
 Oren Yoel – production, instruments, programming

Charts

References

2015 songs
Miley Cyrus songs
Music videos directed by Diane Martel
Song recordings produced by Miley Cyrus
Song recordings produced by Oren Yoel
Songs written by Miley Cyrus
Songs written by Oren Yoel